Boethius is a crater on the planet Mercury.  It was named after Anicius Manlius Severinus Boethius, the Roman philosopher, by the IAU in 1976.

Hollows are present on the arc of mountains within central Boethius.

The smaller crater Caruso is west of Boethius, and Polygnotus is to the east.

References 

Impact craters on Mercury